Mahdi Fleifel (born 25 October 1979 at Dubai) is a Danish-Palestinian film director.

Biography
Mahdi Fleifel was raised in the refugee camp Ein el-Helweh in Lebanon and later in a suburb of Helsingør in Denmark. In 2009 he graduated from the National Film and Television School at Beaconsfield, Buckinghamshire. In 2010 he set up the London-based production company Nakba FilmWorks.

His debut feature documentary, A World Not Ours, picked up several awards. His short film, A Man Returned, won the Silver Bear and the European Film Nomination at the Berlinale and his film, A Drowning Man, was in the Official Selection at the Cannes Film Festival 2017.

Filmography

References

Danish film directors
1979 births
Palestinian emigrants to Denmark
Living people